Aschbach is a commune in the Bas-Rhin department in the Grand Est region of north-eastern France.

The inhabitants of the commune are known as Aschbachois or Aschbachoises.

Geography
Aschbach is located some 13 km south by south-east of Wissembourg and 8 km east of Soultz-sous-Forêts. Access to the commune is by the D245 road from Stundwiller in the south passing through the village and continuing north to Seebach. With exception of a small band of forest on the western border the commune is entirely farmland.

The Seebach river forms the eastern border of the commune as it flows south to join the Seltzbach at Buhl. An unnamed stream rises in the centre of the commune and flows south-east through the village to join the Seebach on the south-eastern border.

History
In the 14th century Aschbach was the property of the Diocese of Speyer (Germany). Under the Ancien Régime Aschbach, Stundwiller, and Oberroedern formed the Superior Court with their church at Stundwiller. These three villages were merged in 1974 but Aschbach was separated again in 1988.

According to the cadastral plan of 1839 there were buildings built close together and also other places which were marshlands. The school was built in 1833, an oratory at a place called Kreutzfeld dates to 1864, and the church was built in 1871.

The village suffered terrible damage in the Second World War and reconstruction gave the village a new look with a larger and more open built-up area. The presbytery was built in 1950.

Heraldry

Administration

List of Successive Mayors

Demography
In 2017 the commune had 682 inhabitants.

Sites and monuments

Aschbach has four registrations as historical monuments. These are:
Parish Church of the Immaculate Conception (1871, 1908, 1928)
Farmhouse at 19 Grand Rue (18th-20th century)
House and Farms (18th and 19th century)
The Village (14th century)

The Church of the Immaculate Conception has many items which are registered as historical objects. These are:
2 Monstrances (around 1871)
Monstrance (around 1871)
Cross: Christ on the cross (around 1871)
Painting: Saint Joseph with the child Jesus (around 1871)
10 Statues of Saints (around 1871)
Pulpit, 2 Confessionals, Baptismal fonts (around 1871)
3 Altars, 3 Tabernacles, 3 Retables, church stall, half-height panelling (main altar, altar tombstone, secondary altar) (around 1871)
Furniture in the Church
Wayside cross: Christ on the cross at Hohlacker (1809)

Aschbach Picture Gallery

Inside the Church

See also
 Communes of the Bas-Rhin department

References

External links
 Aschbach on the National Geographical Institute website 
Aschbach on Géoportail, National Geographic Institute (IGN) website 
Asbach on the 1750 Cassini Map

Communes of Bas-Rhin